Safar Ghahremani (Persian: صفر قهرمانی)  known as Safar Khan (Persian: صفر خان) (born in Ajab Shir, in Iranian Azerbaijan on 4 May 1921 and died on 10 November 2002 in Tehran) was an Iranian leftist dissident and a member of (The Tudeh Party) of Iran, who spent 32 years of his life in prison. Some say he was the longest serving political prisoner in the world. He was a prominent member of Fedaiyeins, the armed group of the autonomous government in Iranian Azerbaijan, that came to power right after World War Two and was crushed savagely by the Shah's regime a year later, causing the death of thousands of people in that region. Safar and his men continued the guerilla style resistance against the Shah's army for about a year until his arrest in 1947. Originally, he was sentenced to death but later that sentence was changed to life imprisonment. He endured physiological and physical torture for more than 30 years in Shah's prisons until his release in the fall of 1978, on the eve of Iranian revolution. After his release he went back to Tabriz and his home village and thousands of people  greeted him as a national hero.

References

Sources 
 Misagh Parsa: Social Origins of the Iranian Revolution. New Brunswick : Rutgers University Press, 1989. P. 151.  Accessed on 7 February 2013.

External links 
 

20th-century Iranian people
People from East Azerbaijan Province
1921 births
2002 deaths
Tudeh Party of Iran politicians